Danny O'Carroll (born 16 October 1983) is an Irish actor and producer. He is best known for portraying Buster Brady (associate of the son of matriarch Agnes Brown) on stage, and in the BBC and RTÉ television sitcom Mrs. Brown's Boys.

Early life and family
O'Carroll was born on 16 October 1983 in Dublin. He is the son of Brendan O'Carroll, who plays Agnes Brown in the series. He is the brother of Fiona O'Carroll, nephew of Eilish O'Carroll, and stepson of Jennifer Gibney, all of whom feature in the series.

Career
As well as Mrs. Brown's Boys, O'Carroll also starred in and was an executive producer of the Mrs. Brown's Boys D'Movie.

Channel 4 offered him an international travel series.

Due to family commitments, O'Carroll declined the opportunity to participate in Dancing on Ice in 2019.

Personal life
O'Carroll lives in County Donegal. He is involved in fundraising for various causes, including autism, mental health and childhood illnesses.

O'Carroll has been married to Amanda Woods since 2007.  Woods plays Betty Brown in the show and has two children with O'Carroll, Jamie and Blake.

Filmography

Film

Television

References

External links

1983 births
Living people
21st-century Irish male actors
Irish male television actors
Male actors from Dublin (city)